Vojo Deretic, is distinguished professor and chair of the Department of Molecular Genetics and Microbiology at the University of New Mexico School of Medicine. Deretic was the founding director of the Autophagy, Inflammation and Metabolism (AIM) Center of Biomedical Research Excellence. The AIM center promotes autophagy research nationally and internationally.

Education 
Vojo Peter Deretic received his undergraduate, graduate and postdoctoral education in Belgrade, Paris, and Chicago. He was a faculty member at the University of Texas, University of Michigan, and joined University of New Mexico Health Sciences Center in 2001.

Career and research 
Vojo Deretic's main contributions to science come from studies by his team on the role of autophagy in infection and immunity. Autophagy is a cytoplasmic pathway with quality control and metabolic roles. Autophagic removal of damaged or surplus organelles, has been  implicated in cancer, neurodegeneration such as Alzheimer's disease, Huntington's disease and Parkinson's disease, diabetes, development, and aging. Deretic's group is one of those that made the discovery that autophagic degradation is a major effector of innate and possibly adaptive immunity mechanisms for direct elimination of intracellular microbes (such as Mycobacterium tuberculosis). This has placed immunity and infection on the repertoire of autophagy's sphere of influence.

Studies in the Deretic laboratory have contributed to our understanding of the basic mechanisms of autophagy in mammalian and human cells   applicable to generic, i.e. metabolic and quality control autophagy, as well as to autophagy processes specializing in immune functions. The work by Deretic and colleagues has shown how autophagosomes form in mammalian cells, identifying  HyPAS (hybrid pre-autophagosomal structure) prophagophores as direct precursors to autophagosomes in mammalian cells. The HypAS prophagophores are formed through a membrane fusion between endosomes endowed with the E3 ligase ATG16L1 and the cis-Golgi derived FIP200 vesicles and cisternae.

The tight relationship between autophagy as a quality control and metabolic process on the one hand, and as innate immunity process on the other hand, probably harks back to the bacteral endosymbiotic origins of mitochondria. From bacteria to viruses, autophagy and autophagy-related processes, often referred to as non-canonical autophagy, recently categorized as different manifestations of membrane Atg8ylation,  play roles in controlling microbes or are targeted by pathogens. For example, as shown in a study  from the Deretic laboratory,  SARS-CoV-2 inhibits the earliest stage of autophagosome formation in human cells known as the prophagophore or HyPAS.

Deretic's laboratory has linked autophagy with several families of innate immunity proteins. This includes TLRs, TBK1, immunity related GTPases such as IRGM  and TRIMs, such as TRIM5 (implicated in HIV restriction), TRIM16 and PYRIN/TRIM20 (implicated in inflammasome regulation), and TRIM21 (implicated in Type I Interferon responses) etc. TRIMs play immune and other roles but with incompletely understood function(s), and the above cited work shows that they act as autophagic receptor-regulators in mammalian cells. A series of studies from Deretic's group shows how the human immunity related GTPase IRGM works in autophagy by demonstrating IRGM's direct interactions with the core autophagy (ATG) factors, and their assembly and activation downstream of PRRs: NOD1, NOD2, TLRs, RIG-I and inflammasome components, enabling them to carry out antimicrobial and anti-inflammatory autophagic functions of significance in tuberculosis and Crohn's disease. A related line of studies shows that IRGM helps recruit a SNARE Syntaxin 17, which is also a target for phosphorylation and control by TBK1 and plays a role in both autophagy initiation and maturation. Both IRGM and Syntaxin 17 bind mammalian ATG8s such as MAP1LC3B (LC3s) and GABARAPs. A recent study shows that IRGM controls lysosomal biogenesis though binding to and controlling TFEB, the key transcriptional regulator of lysosomal genes. Moreover, mammalian ATG8s, which interact with IRGM, are upstream of lysosomal biogenesis and control both mTOR and TFEB.

The notion that mammalian ATG8s (mATG8s), such as GABARAPs and LC3s, are simply builders of autophagosomal membrane and recruiters of autophagy cargo receptors may need to be revisited. A recent review  by Deretic and colleagues proposes the principle of "atg8ylation" as a general membrane stress response mirroring what ubiquitylation does for stressed proteins. Furthermore, the  mammalian ATG8s association with SNAREs has proven to be far more general than originally anticipated. It has recently been expanded to a large number of other SNAREs, with one specific subset  characterized as driving lysosome biogenesis via a TGN-lysosome trafficking route. These studies have led to an unanticipated alternative model for how mammalian ATG8s work – by broadly interacting  with and modulating SNAREs  to redirect general intracellular membrane flow toward the organelles that converge upon the lysosomal-autolysosomal system. Moreover, recent studies show that mammalian ATG8s actually regulate lysosomal biogenesis, expanding or potentially revising their function that was originally restricted to be autophagosomal formation. The concept of atg8ylation posits that mATG8s and atg8ylation represent to membranes what ubiquitin and ubiquitylation represent to proteins, and that, paralleling manifestations of ubiquitylation, atg8ylation of stressed or remodeling membranes has a plethora of biological consequences, only one of which is autophagy, as reviewed in June 2022 by Deretic and Lazarou. Membrane atg8ylation controls many functions, and has recently been shown to elicit and coordinate during lysosomal membrane stress multiple effector mechanisms: mTOR inactivation,  stress granule formation, inhibition of general protein translation via IF2α phosphorylation, and  integrated stress response via ATF4.

The most recent studies by Deretic's group from the AIM center for autophagy, inflammation and metabolism studies, provide insight into how cells detect endomembrane and plasma membrane damage and what systems are deployed to help repair or eliminate/replace such membranes. In a paper in Molecular Cell, this group has shown that a novel system termed GALTOR, based on Galectin-8, interacts with the mTOR regulatory system composed of SLC38A9, Ragulator, RagA/B, RagCD. Following lysosomal damage, GALTOR inhibits mTOR causing its dissociation from  damaged lysosomes. The key to GALTOR's action are galectins, sugar-binding cytosolic proteins, which can detect  glycoconjugates exposed on the lumenal (exofacial)  side of the lysosomal membrane upon membrane damage, thus  transducing the breach of the membrane to mTOR. The physiological consequences of mTOR inhibition following endomembrane damage are many including induction of autophagy and metabolic switching. The functional roles of galectins in cellular response to membrane damage are rapidly expanding and Deretic's group has recently shown that Galectin-3 recruits ESCRTs to damaged lysosomes so that lysosomes can be repaired. Most recent findings show that Galectin-9 responds to lysosomal damage by activating AMPK, a central regulator of metabolism and autophagy. This occurs by Galectin-9-dependent activation of the ubiquitination systems on damaged lysosomes resulting in K63-ubiqutination of TAK1, an upstream kinase that phosphorylates and activates AMPK. Continuing the theme of homeostatic responses to membrane damage, Deretic's group has recently shown that ATG9A, primarily considered to be a core autophagy gene and one of the few that are membrane integral proteins, organizes the ESCRT machinery along with a Ca2+ responsive protein IQGAP1 to protect plasma membrane from damage, and programmed or incidental permeabilization. ATG9A marshals ESCRT proteins to repair pores on plasma membrane introduced by gasdermin (GSDMD) during pyroptosis, by MLKL during necroptosis, by Mycobacterium tuberculosis  during infection of host cells, and by SARS-CoV-2 ORF3a's MLKL-like action at the plama membrane. This expands the scope of the membrane homeostasis role of autophagy proteins beyond the process of degradative autophagy.

The Deretic laboratory has shown that autophagy in mammalian cells plays not only a degradative role  but that it also carries the task of unconventional secretion of cytoplasmic proteins. This has led to the term "secretory autophagy". This work, along with the work by others in yeast, extends the influence sphere of autophagy from its canonical roles inside the cell and the confines of the intracellular space to the extracellular space, affecting cell-cell interactions, inflammation, tissue organization, function, and remodeling.

Autophagy and coronavirus biology are intertwined. SARS-CoV-2 inhibits autophagosomal prophagophore (HyPAS) formation, likely to divert cellular membranes for the formation of protrusion-type viral-replication and viral assembly compartments or to protect the coronavirus. Another example is that  ATG9A protein protects cells against plasma membrane damage caused by SARS-CoV-2 ORF3a. Deretic's group has previously shown how chloroquine works by functions in respiratory epithelial cells including suppressing inflammation and drivers of fibrosis that can lead to lung damage and loss of function, and recently put that in the context of how chloroquine, azithromycin and ciprofloxacin may help with the covid19 pandemic crisis. A follow-up study indicates that ciprofloxacin has potent effects on inhibiting SARS-CoV-2 in Vero E6 cells as measured by reduced cytopathic effects, quantitative RT-PCR and plaque forming units. Ambroxol is another drug that has beneficial effects in Vero E6 cells.

A comprehensive review with over 1,500 citations by Deretic and colleagues summarizes the role of autophagy in immunity and inflammation: A more recent review  by Deretic in the Cell Press journal Immunity  summarizes the role of autophagy in inflammation and how it affects various diseases, from autoimmunity to cancer, infections (including COVID-19), cardiovascular and liver diseases,  neurodegeneration, diabetes and metabolic disorders.

Some of the early publications (the original discovery that autophagy acts against intracellular microbes with >2,000 citations) include: Cell and in Science.

Several more recent primary publications include reports in Cell  Molecular Cell, Developmental Cell, Journal of Cell Biology and Nature Cell Biology.

See also 
 Autophagy Inflammation and Metabolism (AIM) Center

References 

American geneticists
American microbiologists
Living people
University of Michigan faculty
University of New Mexico faculty
Year of birth missing (living people)